Bengal was launched at Greenock in February 1815. She was the first vessel built in Scotland for the East India trade. She immediately made three voyages to India, sailing under a licence from the British East India Company (EIC). She then traded with the United States, alternating that with other voyages to India. In 1819, on one voyage to India, she was anchored at Calcutta and the venue for a party that resulted in her captain, surgeon, and about a fifth of the guests all dying within days of an unknown disease. She was wrecked in about 1847.

Career
Messrs. Steele and Carsewell, of the Bay of Quick, Greenock launched Bengal in February 1815. She was the first vessel built in Scotland for the East India trade.

Bengal first appeared in Lloyd's Register in 1815.

In 1813 the EIC had lost its monopoly on the trade between India and Britain. British ships were then free to sail to India or the Indian Ocean under a licence from the EIC.

On 12 June 1815, Bengal, Frayer, master, sailed for Bengal and Madras under a licence from the EIC. Bengal, Fayrer, master, was reported to have arrived at Liverpool from Bengal in June 1816.

In February 1817, Bengal, built at Greenock in 1815, Cuthbertson, master, sailed from Britain, bound for Bombay. She arrived in the Hooghly River in March 1818. By late October she had returned to Liverpool.

On 12 June 1819, Bengal, built at Greenock in 1815, G. Woodward, master, sailed for Fort William, India. She was reported as having arrived at Bengal on 9 July. On 25 August she sailed from Bengal to Liverpool. Around 23 September she returned to Calcutta to effect repairs after having sustained damage in the Hooghli on her way to Liverpool. On 5 October it was reported that she had put back leaky and was expected to have to go into dock. On 5 April 1820 Bengal, "late Woodward", arrived back at Liverpool from Bengal.

George Woodward had died on 14 November 1819, at Calcutta, aged 29. On 14 October he had given a party aboard Bengal that resulted in about a dozen deaths from among the 50 guests. A longer account lists eight dead, including Woodward and Bengals surgeon, and gives Woodward's age as 40. Several other crew also died. "Effluvia" from the 17,000 buffalo horns that made up her cargo, was suspected, but this suspicion did not arise until after Bengal had sailed and could not be conveyed to her.

On 29 September 1823 Bengal, Pearce, master, sailed for Calcutta. On 20 August 1824 Bengal arrived at St Helena from Bengal. The next day she sailed for London. On 18 October she arrived back at Liverpool.

Lloyd's Registers list of licensed voyages reported that on 3 June 1824 Bengal, Pearce, master, had sailed for Calcutta. This appears to be an error.

On 3 February 1825, Bengal, M'Leod, master sailed for Calcutta. On 17 November she arrived at the Cape of Good Hope from Bengal, and sailed for Liverpool on the 20th for Liverpool.

Fate
The volume of Lloyd's Register for 1846 carried the annotation "Wrecked" by Bengals name.

Notes

Citations

References
 
 
 
 
 
 

1815 ships
Ships built on the River Clyde
Merchant ships of the United Kingdom
Age of Sail merchant ships
Maritime incidents in 1847